Joel Otim Bua (2 July 1971 – 16 June 2021) was a Ugandan sprinter.

Biography
He competed in the men's 100m competition at the 1992 Summer Olympics. He recorded a 10.94, not enough to qualify for the next round past the heats. His personal best was 10.50, set in 1990. He was vice-president of the Uganda Olympians Association (UOA) since its inception in 2014. He died in Kampala.

References

1971 births
2021 deaths
Ugandan male sprinters
Athletes (track and field) at the 1992 Summer Olympics
Olympic athletes of Uganda
Deaths from the COVID-19 pandemic in Uganda